A History of Chess is a book written by H. J. R. Murray (1868–1955) and published in 1913.

Details
Murray's aim is threefold: to present as complete a record as is possible of the varieties of chess that exist or have existed in different parts of the world; to investigate the ultimate origin of these games and the circumstances of the invention of chess; and to trace the development of the modern European game from the first appearance of its ancestor, the Indian chaturanga, in the beginning of the 7th century.

The first part of the book describes the history of the Asiatic varieties of chess, the Arabic and Persian literature on chess, and the theory and practice of the game of shatranj. The second part is concerned with chess in Europe in the Middle Ages, its role in literature and in the moralities, and with medieval chess problems, leading up to the beginning of modern chess and the history of the modern game through to the 19th century.

Murray, who knew the English and German languages, taught himself Arabic to read chess documents. By collating sources and eliminating duplicates therein he lists 553 complete Islamic shatranj chess problems and their stated solutions, plus 16 mikhāriq ("puzzles", singular mikhrāq) (which he numbers RW29 and 554 to 568). During this, he was caused extra work by finding that one of his Arabic-language source documents was descended from a predecessor whose pages had been shuffled and some pages lost, which was then copied by another scribe in old times.

The book also contains a list of medieval European chess problems.

As some chess variants do not use an 8×8 board, he uses the algebraic notation to represent chess moves, but:
 He represents a capture by piece × piece, not piece × square.
 He writes P at the start of a pawn move.

He quotes lengths of text from older European sources untranslated from their original languages (medieval forms of French and German and Spanish etc.).

Other books
Murray's companion work was A History of Board-Games other than Chess . He also wrote a new history of the game from its beginnings until 1866, called A Short History of Chess. This was found among the papers left behind at his death in 1955, and was published, with contributions by B. Goulding Brown and Harry Golombek, in 1963.

Impact
In the words of Daniel E. O'Sullivan,

David Shenk writes in The Immortal Game:

Printing data
Murray, H. J. R. A History of Chess (London: Oxford University Press, 1913)
Murray, H. J. R. A History of Chess (Northampton, MA: Benjamin Press, 1985) 
Murray, H. J. R. A History of Chess (New York: Skyhorse Publishing, 2012, paperback reprint of the 1913 edition)

References

External links
 A History Of Chess by H. J. R. Murray at the Internet Archive

1913 non-fiction books
Chess books
History of chess
1913 in chess